Ibrahim Awariki (22 January 1928 – 15 September 2002) was a Lebanese wrestler. He competed in the men's Greco-Roman lightweight at the 1960 Summer Olympics.

References

External links
 

1928 births
2002 deaths
Lebanese male sport wrestlers
Olympic wrestlers of Lebanon
Wrestlers at the 1960 Summer Olympics
People from Nabatieh